Len Evans may refer to:

Len Evans (footballer) (1903–1977), Welsh international football goalkeeper
Len Evans (wine) (1930–2006), Australian wine columnist
Leonard Evans (1929–2016), Canadian politician
W. Leonard Evans Jr., African American businessman